is a school of kobudō (ancient martial arts) specializing in iaijutsu (quick-draw sword art) founded by Kawabata Terutaka in 2006. The origins of the Ryushin Shouchi Ryu can be traced to the Tenshinsho Jigen Ryu, a branch tradition of the Tenshin Shōden Katori Shintō-ryū. The current headmaster of the Ryushin Shouchi Ryu is Yahagi Kunikazu.

History

The Ryushin Shouchi Ryu is a branch tradition of the Tenshinsho Jigen Ryu, a system founded by Tose Yosazaemon Osamune (十瀬 与三左衛門 長宗, c. 1540- c. 1600) around the Eiroku Era (1558- 1570) specializing in iaijutsu and kenjutsu. Tose was a land-holding samurai from Hitachi province. While in his twenties he traveled to Katori Shrine to study the Tenshin Shōden Katori Shintō-ryū under the third headmaster, Iizasa Wakasa no Kami Morinobu. After five years of training he received a menkyo kaiden (license of mastery) and would go on to continue his studies at Kashima Shrine. While at Kashima, Tose became enlightened, and through an oracle, received a catalog of techniques from Takemikazuchi. It was after this divine inspiration that he created the Tenshinsho Jigen Ryu, taking the Tenshinshō (true and correct transmission from the deity of Katori Shrine, Futsunushi) from the Tenshin Shōden Katori Shintō-ryū, and adding the term "self-power revelation" (jigen) which had come to him after his spiritual ordeal at Kashima Shrine. He would later travel to Satsuma where he would meet his eventual successor Kaneko Shinkurō Morisada (金子 新九郎 盛貞, c. 1520- c. 1585).

The third headmaster, Terasaka Yakurō Masatsune (赤坂 弥九郎 政雅, 1567- 1594), was introduced to Kaneko at the age of 13 to begin his studies in swordsmanship for the purpose of avenging his father's death. By the time he was 17 years old Terasaka had mastered the Tenshinshō Jigen-ryū and avenged his father's death when he was 19 years old. Shortly after, he moved to Kyoto to become a monk at Tenneiji Temple of the Sōtō Zen School where he took on the Buddhist dharma name Zenkitsu (善吉, also read Zenkichi). In 1588, Tōgō Shigekata would become Zenkitsu's best student, mastering the Tenshinshō Jigen-ryū in less than a year. Tōgō Shigekata (東郷 重位, 1560- 1643) would go on to combine the Taisha-ryū, which he had previously learned from the founder, Marume Kurandonosuke Tessai, and the Tenshinshō Jigen-ryū to create the Jigen-ryū. According to tradition, the Tenshinshō Jigen-ryū would remain a well-kept secret through the Jigen-ryū and Yakumaru Jigen-ryū lines, and passed down through a series of dai (a line of headmasters not related by blood) for nearly 400 years.

The Tenshinshō Jigen-ryū would see a revival under the 27th headmaster, Ueno Yasuyuki Genshin (上野 靖之 源心, 1913- 1972), when he began instructing in Asakusa, Tokyo until his death in 1972. It was at this time that Kawabata Terutaka (河端 照孝, b. July 12, 1940) began his swordsmanship training at the Sōgō Budō Shōbukan, which was founded in 1963 by his father and was under the guidance of Ueno Yasuyuki Genshin. After Ueno's death Kawabata would continue his training and eventually establish the Seiseikan in Akabane, Tokyo where he founded the Ryūshin Jigen-ryū in 2006. In 2008, Kawabata's best student, Yahagi Kunikazu (矢作 訓一, b. April 5, 1948), would become the second headmaster of the Ryūshin Jigen-ryū.

In 2011, to clarify the purpose of the school in cultivating the mind and conditioning the body through rigorous training, the original name of the school, Ryūshin Jigen-ryū, was changed to Ryushin Shouchi Ryu. The name Ryushin Shouchi Ryu was selected by the founder, Kawabata Terutaka. Ryūshin (柳心) means "Mind or Heart of the Willow tree" and invokes the image of a tree which does not lose its leaves even in winter; while Shouchi (照智) can be translated as "shining wisdom". Together, these characters convey the sense of “establishing in the world an unmovable wisdom and everyday mind by means of a strong yet flexible body and spirit.”

Today, the Ryushin Shouchi Ryu is practiced across the globe with several schools in the United States, Europe and Japan. Every year, Yahagi makes official trips to conduct training courses abroad, where he receives the warm support of his overseas students. The Ryushin Shouchi Ryu also takes part in the Annual Kobudo Dedication Demonstrations (Kobudō Hōnō Enbu Taikai) at Katori Shrine every year; an event that has been taking place for over 25 years.

References

External links 
 Official Ryushin Shouchi Ryu Website
 Additional Ryushin Shouchi Ryu Website
 Official Ryushin Shouchi Ryu Facebook Page

Japanese martial arts
Japanese swordsmanship